Metin Tekin (born 8 May 1964) is a Turkish football manager and former professional player who played as a striker or winger. As a player, he spent most of his career with Beşiktaş JK.

Career statistics

Club

International

Scores and results list Turkey's goal tally first, score column indicates score after each Tekin goal.

Individual
Beşiktaş J.K. Squads of Century (Golden Team)

References

External links
Metin Tekin picture and his comments on UEFA-CAF Meridian cup

1964 births
Living people
Sportspeople from İzmit
Turkish footballers
Association football midfielders
Association football forwards
Turkey international footballers
Turkey under-21 international footballers
Turkey youth international footballers
Süper Lig players
Beşiktaş J.K. footballers
Vanspor footballers
Turkish football managers
Süper Lig managers
Altay S.K. managers